Alice Elizabeth Fraser Powell (born 26 January 1993) is a British racing driver. In 2010, she became the first woman to win a Formula Renault championship and in 2012 became the first woman to score points in the GP3 Series. In 2014, she returned to racing in Formula Renault and added to her championship victories by taking first place in the International Class of the 2014 Asian Formula Renault Series. In 2019, Powell was one of the 18 women selected to compete in the inaugural W Series championship. During the course of the season's six races, Powell took four podium finishes, including a win at the series finale race at Brands Hatch, and finished third in the championship standings. Following an enforced hiatus caused by the global COVID-19 pandemic, Powell returned to the W Series for the 2021 championship and won the opening race of the year, at the Red Bull Ring.

Racing career

Formula Renault
Powell was born in Oxford, England. She learned to drive at the age of six, and started her career in karting two years later. In 2009, at 16, she drove in the Michelin Formula Renault UK Championship, becoming the youngest female driver in a Formula Renault race. Powell finished the year as runner up for the Young Star Award at the Women of the Future Awards. She was also awarded the British Women Racing Drivers Club GoldStars 'Elite' category Award. Powell set a record in the fourth round of the 2010 Formula Renault BARC Championship by becoming the first woman to win a Formula Renault race in the UK, and later in the year became the first woman to win a Formula Renault championship. During the 2010 season Powell's race engineer was Sarah Shaw. Powell and Manor returned to the Formula Renault UK championship in 2011, but failed to win a race and finished the season in 9th place in the championship.

Powell returned to Formula Renault three years later, driving for FRD Motorsport in the International Class of the 2014 Asian Formula Renault Series. During the 11 race season Powell took five class victories, four of which were also outright race wins, and won the class.

GP3 Series
On 16 April 2012, after only two test days in the GP3 car, it was announced that Powell would drive for the Status Grand Prix team in the 2012 GP3 Series. On 9 September that year she finished 8th in the 2012 Monza GP3 round sprint race, and in doing so became the first female points scorer since the inception of the GP3 Series in 2010.

Formula 3

Powell joined F3 Cup for 2013 having been unable to continue in the GP3 Series. She took part in the opening round of the 2013 British Formula 3 season at Silverstone, driving the Mark Bailey Racing run Dallara F306, which she also raced in the MotorSport Vision Formula Three Cup.

In the 2013 MotorSport Vision Formula Three Cup, Powell finished second in the championship behind Alex Craven, having won five times during the season including three of the first four races.

Formula 1
On 12 November 2014 Powell was reported as trying to raise funds to drive a Caterham Formula One car, in a free practice session at the end of season Abu Dhabi Grand Prix. The Caterham team had gone into administration in October 2014 and had not attended the previous two Grands Prix. It was later reported that Powell had abandoned the idea as it was unlikely that the appropriate superlicence could be obtained.

Formula E
In 2020, it was announced that Powell, now an ambassador for Dare to Be Different, would take part in the Rookie Test after the 2020 Marrakesh ePrix, driving for Envision Virgin Racing, partnering Nick Cassidy. Powell later became the Simulator and Development Driver for the team beginning in the 2021-2022 season.

MRF Challenge
Powell signed up to compete in the first race of the 2015-16 edition of the MRF Challenge. At the first round in Abu Dhabi, Powell scored four top ten finishes out of four races, with a best finish of eighth in the final race, after being out of single seaters for nearly a year.

W Series 

Powell participated in the inaugural W Series Championship in 2019. She won the season-ending race at Brands Hatch along with three other podium finishes, finishing 3rd overall in the standings.

Powell returned to W Series in 2021 competing with the newly formed Racing X team. Powell dominated the first race of the season at the Red Bull Ring, taking her first pole position, setting the fastest lap and leading every lap to take the race win. Powell finished the season with 3 wins, 5 podiums & 132 points as she went on to finish runner-up to Jamie Chadwick. Powell won the Silverstone and Zandvoort rounds and finished 27 points behind champion Chadwick.

Commentary career

Powell joined the Sky Sports Formula 2 commentary team when the 2020 season resumed in July 2020, after delays and cancellations due to the COVID-19 pandemic.

Personal life
Powell attended The Cotswold School. In 2013, she was included in the BBC series 100 Women.

Racing record

Career summary 

† As Powell was a guest driver, she was ineligible for points.

Complete GP3 Series results
(key) (Races in bold indicate pole position) (Races in italics indicate fastest lap)

Complete W Series results
(key) (Races in bold indicate pole position) (Races in italics indicate fastest lap)

Complete WeatherTech SportsCar Championship results
(key) (Races in bold indicate pole position) (Races in italics indicate fastest lap)

Complete Jaguar I-Pace eTrophy results
(key) (Races in bold indicate pole position)

† As Powell was a guest driver, she was ineligible for points.

References

External links

1993 births
Living people
Sportspeople from Oxford
English racing drivers
English female racing drivers
British Formula Renault 2.0 drivers
British Formula Three Championship drivers
Formula Renault 2.0 NEC drivers
Formula Renault BARC drivers
GP3 Series drivers
Asian Formula Renault Challenge drivers
BBC 100 Women
W Series drivers
Ginetta GT4 Supercup drivers
Ginetta Junior Championship drivers
Carlin racing drivers
MRF Challenge Formula 2000 Championship drivers
WeatherTech SportsCar Championship drivers
Manor Motorsport drivers
Status Grand Prix drivers
Meyer Shank Racing drivers
Formula Palmer Audi drivers
Chris Dittmann Racing drivers
Craft-Bamboo Racing drivers